William George de Burgh  (24 October 1866 – 27 August 1943) was an English philosopher who was Professor of Philosophy at the University of Reading.

Career 
Born on 24 October 1866 in Wandsworth, de Burgh was educated at Winchester and Merton College, Oxford. He was a founding member of the University of Reading, where he became Professor of Philosophy in 1907. His works include Towards a Religious Philosophy (1937), From Morality to Religion (1938),  and The Legacy of the Ancient World (1924). 

A committed Anglican, he endeavoured to justify the revealed truth of the gospel in terms of rationalism and thereby defend it against both the contemporary Protestant theological trend for anti-rationalism and the dominant philosophy of logical positivism. He died 27 August 1943 in Toller Porcorum, Dorset.

References

Bibliography 

 
 
 
 

1866 births
1943 deaths
20th-century British philosophers
Academics of the University of Reading
Alumni of Merton College, Oxford
Anglican philosophers
Fellows of the British Academy
People from the London Borough of Wandsworth
Presidents of the Aristotelian Society
Academics from London